Cobalt Air served the following destinations as of September 2018. On 17 October 2018, Cobalt Airways suspended all operations indefinitely.

List

Former destinations

Terminated destinations

References

External links 
 Official website

Cobalt Air